is a passenger railway station in the city of Matsudo, Chiba, Japan, operated by the third sector Hokusō Railway.

Lines

Station layout
This station consists of two opposed side platforms serving two tracks, located in a cutting below ground level, with the station building at ground level above.

Platforms

Adjacent stations

History
Akiyama Station was opened on 31 March 1991. On 17 July 2010 a station numbering system was introduced to the Hokusō Line, with the station designated HS04.

Passenger statistics
In fiscal 2018, the station was used by an average of 7713 passengers daily.

Surrounding area
 Chiba Prefectural Matsugo Koyo High School
 Matsudo Minami High School

Buses

References

External links

 Hokusō Line station information 

Railway stations in Japan opened in 1991
Railway stations in Chiba Prefecture
Hokusō Line
Matsudo